Elections to Liverpool City Council were held on Thursday 1 November 1894. One third of the council seats were up for election, the term of office of each councillor being three years.

Eleven of the sixteen seats were uncontested.

After the election, the composition of the council was:

Election result

Because of the large number of uncontested seats, these statistics should be taken in that context.

Ward results

* - Retiring Councillor seeking re-election

Abercromby

Castle Street

Everton

Exchange

Great George

Lime Street

North Toxteth

Pitt Street

Rodney Street

St. Anne Street

St. Paul's

St. Peter's

Scotland

South Toxteth

Vauxhall

West Derby

By-elections

Councillor Thomas Kelly (Irish Nationalist, Vauxhall, elected 1 November 1893) died on 17 October 1895.

As the November 1895 election was near and an all-up election, there was no by-election.

See also

 Liverpool City Council
 Liverpool Town Council elections 1835 - 1879
 Liverpool City Council elections 1880–present
 Mayors and Lord Mayors of Liverpool 1207 to present
 History of local government in England

References

1894
1894 English local elections
November 1894 events
1890s in Liverpool